The 2012 FIBA Europe Under-16 Championship for Women Division B was the 9th edition of the Division B of the European basketball championship for women's national under-16 teams. It was played in Tallinn, Estonia, from 12 to 22 July 2012. Lithuania women's national under-16 basketball team won the tournament.

Participating teams

  (16th place, 2011 FIBA Europe Under-16 Championship for Women Division A)

  (15th place, 2011 FIBA Europe Under-16 Championship for Women Division A)

First round
In the first round, the teams were drawn into four groups. The first three teams from each group will advance to the second round (Groups E and F) and the other teams will advance to the 13th–15th place classification (Group G).

Group A

Group B

Group C

Group D

Second round
In the second round, the teams play in two groups of six. The first four teams from each group will advance to the Quarterfinals and the other teams will advance to the 9th–12th place playoffs.

Group E

Group F

13th–15th place classification

Group G

9th–12th place playoffs

Championship playoffs

Final standings

References

2012
2012–13 in European women's basketball
International youth basketball competitions hosted by Estonia
FIBA U16
July 2012 sports events in Europe